John Morgan Francis (March 6, 1823 – June 18, 1897) was an American journalist and diplomat.

Francis was born in Prattsburgh, New York. He left home in 1838 and began working in Canandaigua, New York, for several newspapers.  He moved to Troy, New York in 1846 and was chief editor of the Northern Budget.  Francis   founded the Troy Daily Times on June 25, 1841.  As a diplomat, Francis served as United States Minister to Greece (1871-1873), as Minister Resident/Consul General to Portugal (1882-1884) (originally appointed as Chargé d'Affaires, he took the oath of office, but did not proceed to the post in that capacity), and as Envoy Extraordinary and Minister Plenipotentiary to Austria-Hungary (1884-1885). He was a delegate to the 1894 New York State Constitutional Convention. He died in Troy, New York.

References

1823 births
1897 deaths
People from Prattsburgh, New York
Businesspeople from Troy, New York
Editors of New York (state) newspapers
Ambassadors of the United States to Austria-Hungary
19th-century American diplomats
Ambassadors of the United States to Portugal
Ambassadors of the United States to Greece
American company founders
19th-century American businesspeople